Ahmed Morsi (born 1930) is an Egyptian artist, art critic and poet.

Early life and education

Morsi was born in the coastal city Alexandria, Egypt, in 1930.
In 1954, he graduated from the University of Alexandria, Faculty of Arts with a major in English Literature. During the years 1952-53, he studied art with Silvio Becchi, son of Italian master Otorino Becchi, in Alexandria. Early on, Ahmed Morsi was initiated into Alexandria's literary society as well as the city's very own rising group of artists. By his early twenties, he was participating in group shows with Egypt's most notable modern artists, including A Al Gazzar, H El Telmisani, I Massouda, F Kamel, H Nada and M Moussa. In 1949, he started writing poetry and developed this talent in parallel with his painting – publishing his first Diwan, “Songs of the Temples / Steps in Darkness” at the age of 19.

Career
Morsi moved to Baghdad, Iraq in 1955, where he taught English to supplement his two-year stay. This was a time of a cultural renaissance in Iraq, when Baghdad was a center for the literati, the artists and the intellectuals. It was in Baghdad that he developed a friendship and a working relationship with several Iraqi writers and painters, among them Abd al-Wahhab al-Bayati, Fouad al-Tikerly and Ardash Kakavian; and these relationships continued to produce noteworthy creative cooperation as well as lifelong friendships throughout the coming decades.

Returning to Egypt, he moved to Cairo in 1957. In these years, Ahmed Morsi was the first Egyptian to work alongside Egypt's acclaimed playwrights, Alfred Farag, Abdel Rahman Al Sharkawi, designing stage sets and costumes for The National Theater at the original, Khedieval, Cairo Opera House – art forms that had until then previously been relegated only to Italian designers. He also partnered with Abdel Hadi Al Algazzar and co-designed stage sets for "Bury the Dead" by American playwright Irwin Shaw at the Cairo Opera House. Other projects with Al Gazzar included a book of Morsi's poetry alongside Al Gazzar's drawings. The book was never published due to Al Gazzar's untimely passing, however the poetry/drawings live on. In 1968, he co-founded the avant-garde magazine Galerie 68 with Edwar Al Kharrat, Ibrahim Mansour, Gamil Atteya, Sayed Hegab and others. This publication immediately became Egypt's most reputable source as the voice of the new modernism. With these years began the Artist's journey into the world of criticism, publishing critiques on both art and literature, both of which remaining intimate domains. He wrote two items for Grand Larousse Encyclopédique (1975); “Art in Egypt” and “Art in Iraq”. Again the pioneer, Ahmed Morsi introduced a new creative vehicle to the art public in Egypt with his 1995 show: “The Artist’s Book”. Following his exhibition, a new Biennial, The Artist's Book, was created in Alexandria.

Later life
In 1974, Ahmed Morsi moved to New York City, where he continues to paint, write and critique from his Manhattan home. In 1976, like many artists residing in the NYC area, he took up the art of lithography at The New School, the art of printmaking at The Art Student League and added yet another dimension to his creative tools and in the last 20 years, the Artist embraced photography – the last art form to be included in Ahmed Morsi's extensive palette.

Exhibitions

Among the Solo Shows – Egypt
 1953 First solo show at the University of Alexandria - Alexandria
 1958 Cairo Atelier - Cairo
 1958 Alexandria Museum of Fine Arts - Alexandria
 1959 Cairo Atelier - Cairo
 1960 Alexandria Museum of Fine Arts - Alexandria
 1961 Alexandria Museum of Fine Arts - Alexandria
 1966 Cairo Atelier - Cairo
 1969 Cairo Atelier - Cairo
 1970 Cairo Atelier - Cairo
 1973 Akhnatoun Gallery - Cairo
 1973 Soviet Cultural Center - Alexandria
 1989 Akhnatoun Gallery - Cairo
 1991 “Cavafy Suite”, Mashrabia Gallery - Cairo
 1995 “The Artist’s Book”, Mashrabia Gallery - Cairo
 1996 Akhnatoun Gallery - Cairo
 2003 Akhnatoun Gallery - Cairo
 2005 Akhnatoun Gallery Cairo
 2012 “Metaphysics”, Gallery Misr - Cairo
 2016 "Ahmed Morsi: A Pure Artist" first retrospective in Egypt, Ofok Gallery (Mahmoud Khalil Museum)- Cairo
 2017 "Ahmed Morsi: You Closed Your Eyes in Order to See the Unseen", Gypsum Gallery - Cairo

Among the Solo Shows – International
 1956 Al Wazireyeh Gallery, Society of Iraqi Artists - Baghdad
 1970 The Pace Gallery - London
 1975 Columbia University - NYC
 1977 Asif Gallery - NYC
 1985 Alef Gallery – Washington, DC
 1987 Vorpal Gallery – SoHo, NYC
 1996 Accademia d’Egitto - Rome
 2017 "Ahmed Morsi: Dialogic Imagination", first international retrospective, Sharjah Museum - Sharjah, UAE
 2017 "Ahmed Morsi", Art Dubai - Dubai, UAE

Among the Group Shows
 1954 Inaugural exhibition of the Museum of Fine Arts - Alexandria, Egypt
 1954 Participated in a limited group show with A Al Gazzar, H El Telmisani, I Massouda and the Alexandrian sculptor M Moussa at the Societe d’Alliance Francaise - Alexandria
 1954 Participated in the 1st Alexandria Biennial of Mediterranean Countries at the Museum of Fine Arts 
 1955 Participated in a limited group show with I Massouda, H El Telmisani, F Kamel and H Nada at the Museum of Modern Art and Cultural Center - Alexandria
 1956 Participated in the 2nd Biennial of Mediterranean Countries at the Museum of Fine Arts - Alexandria
 1958 Participated in a second limited group show with A al Gazzar, H El Telmisani, I Massouda, F Kamel and M Moussa at the Alexandria Museum of Fine Arts – Alexandria.
 1958 Participated in the 3rd Biennial of Mediterranean Countries at the Museum of Fine Arts - Alexandria
 1968 Participated in a limited group show with Ahmed El Rachidi, Adam Henein, Hassan Soliman, George El Bahgoury, Gamal Mahmoud, Daoud Aziz, Saad Abdel Wahab, Saleh Reda, Safeya Hilmi Hussein, Omar El Nagdi, Ali Desouki, Kamal Khalifa, Mohamed Hagrass, Mostafa Ahmed, Mostafa El Hallag, Makram Rizkallah and William Izhaq at the Cairo Atelier - Cairo
 1971 The El Wasti International Exhibition - Baghdad
 1996 The 6th International Biennial of Cairo - Cairo
 1996 Participated in another session of the 6th International Cairo Biennial as a member of the committee of Jurors - Cairo
 2007 Participated in the 1st Egypt “Salon” at Amir Taz Palace - Cairo
 2007 Participated in a limited group show – “Spirit of the Moment … Spirit of the Image” – with Ahmed Fuad Selim and Hilmi El Tuni at Ebdaa Art Gallery - Cairo
 2012 Participated in a limited group show, “Surrealism, Present-day Cairo” at The Gallery - Cairo
 2016 Limited group show: "Looking at the World Around You: Contemporary Works From Qatar Museums", Santander Art Gallery - Madrid, Spain
 2016 Limited group show: Debunking Orientalism, Untitled Space - SoHo, NYC, USA
 2016 Limited group show: "When Art Becomes Liberty: The Egyptian Surrealists (1938 - 1965)", Palace of Fine Arts - Cairo, Egypt
 2017 Limited group show: "When Art Becomes Liberty: The Egyptian Surrealists (1938 - 1965)", Museum of Modern and Contemporary Art - Seoul, South Korea

Public collections
 Egyptian Museum of Modern Art - Cairo, Egypt
 Museum of Fine Arts - Alexandria, Egypt
 Mathaf: Arab Museum of Modern Art - Doha, Qatar
 Sharjah Art Foundation - Sharjah, UAE
 Barjeel Art Foundation - Dubai, UAE

Private collections in Egypt, Iraq, Kuwait, Qatar, Saudi Arabia, Syria, France, UK and USA

Other activities
 1956 - 57: Began writing art criticism for Iraqi Newspaper, "Al Akhbar", Al Akhbar - Baghdad
 1958 - 1962: First non-foreigner to design sets and costumes for the Egyptian National Theater - Cairo
 Designed stage sets and costumes for the first play written by Alfred Farag, “The Fall of the Pharaoh”
 Co-designed with Abdel Hadi Al Gazzar settings for the American play “Bury the Dead” by Irwin Shaw
 Designed stage sets for the first play written by Abdel Rahman Al Sharkawi, “The Tragedy of Jamila Bohreid”
 1968: Co-founded “Gallery ‘68” magazine - Cairo
 1995: Introduced to the art public in Egypt “The Artist’s Book”. Thanks to this pioneering effort, The Alexandria
Library established a Biennial solely for this new creative vehicle, “The Artist’s Book”

Criticism, poetry and translation
 1949: Published his first collection of poems, “Songs of Temples / Steps in Darkness” - Alexandria
 1957–1974: Covered the activities of art in Egypt for the 2nd Program Radio in Cairo and participated in the radio program “Culture News Around the World”
 1959: Co-translated “Eluard: The Poet of Freedom and Love” with Iraqi Poet Abdel Wahab Al Bayyati, published by Al Maaret Bookshop - Beirut
 1959: Co-translated “Aragon, : The Poet of Resistance” with Abdel Wahab Al Bayyati, published by Al Maaret Bookshop
- Beirut
 1968: Decided to stop writing poetry out of a sense of estrangement
 1968: Co-published the avant-garde magazine, “Galerie 68”, along with Edwar Al Kharrat, Ibrahim Mansour, Gamil
Atteya and Sayed Hegab – which played a pivotal role in developing the new-modernism of Arabic literature
 1970: 
- The Iraqi Ministry of Culture published his book, “Picasso”

- Translated “A View from a Bridge” by Arthur Miller, which translation and play was staged in the 1970s by The National Theater
 1975: The Iraqi Ministry of Culture published his book, “Introduction to American Black Poetry”
 1997: He reclaimed the poet who was exiled 30 years prior, without calculation
 1999: The Supreme Council of Culture published his study, “Contemporary American Poetry I”
 2001: The National Center for Translation published his book “Readings of Contemporary American Poetry II”
- The League of Books published his book, “Contemporary American Poetry III”

- The Supreme Council of Culture published his book, “American Contemporary Art”
 2012: The Supreme Council of Culture published his Anthology, “The Collected Poems”

References

External links

1930 births
Egyptian painters 
Living people
Egyptian poets 
20th-century Egyptian male artists
20th-century Egyptian painters
20th-century Egyptian poets 
Surrealist artists
People from Alexandria
Egyptian art critics
Egyptian magazine founders
Alexandria University alumni